Diamond Island may refer to:

Islands
 Diamond Island (Myanmar)
 Diamond Island (Cambodia), an island in the Mekong river
 Diamond Island (Grenadines)
 Diamond Island (Tasmania)
 Diamond Island (Kentucky)
 Diamond Island (New York), an island on Lake George (New York)
 Diamond Island (Montana), an island in the Yellowstone River
 Diamond Island (Tennessee)
 Diamond Island (Vermont), an island in Lake Champlain

Other uses
 Diamond Island (film), 2016

See also
 Great Diamond Island, Maine
 Little Diamond Island, Maine
 Diamond Rock, Martinique, a basalt island